Thickly snouted pipefish, Syngnathus variegatus, is a pipefish species which inhabits the Black Sea and Sea of Azov. It is a marine, demersal, ovoviviparous fish.

References

Fish of the Sea of Azov
Fish of the Black Sea
Fish of Europe
Syngnathus
Fish described in 1814